is a Japanese footballer currently playing as a midfielder for Nagano Parceiro.

Career statistics

Club
.

Notes

References

External links

1997 births
Living people
Association football people from Hokkaido
Toyo University alumni
Japanese footballers
Association football midfielders
J3 League players
AC Nagano Parceiro players